R. Peter MacKinnon,  (born 1947) is a Canadian lawyer and legal academic. MacKinnon served as the president of the University of Saskatchewan from 1999 to 2012. On 1 July 2014, he was named as the interim president of Athabasca University.

On 15 January 2019, MacKinnon started serving as interim president of Dalhousie University upon the resignation of Richard Florizone and served until the announcement of the next president, Deep Saini.

Biography
Born in Prince Edward Island, he received a BA from Dalhousie University, an LL.B from Queen's University and a LL.M from the University of Saskatchewan. He is a member of the Ontario Bar and Saskatchewan Bar. He was created a Queen's Counsel in 1990. He is married to Janice MacKinnon, a Canadian historian and former minister of finance for the Province of Saskatchewan. They have two children, Alan and William.

In 1975, he joined the faculty of the University of Saskatchewan as an assistant professor of law. He became an associate professor in 1978 and a professor in 1983. He served as chair of the University of Saskatchewan Faculty Association from 1983–84. From 1979 to 1981, he was the assistant dean of law and was the dean of law from 1988 to 1998. In 1999, he was appointed the eighth president of the University of Saskatchewan. On March 9, MacKinnon announced that he would be stepping down as president of the University of Saskatchewan, effective June 30, 2012. He is succeeded by Ilene Busch-Vishniac, former provost and vice-president (academic) at McMaster University.

From 2003 to 2005, he was the chairman of the Association of Universities and Colleges of Canada, the organization representing Canada's  universities.

In 2006, it was reported that he was one of three "short list" candidates to be recommended to be appointed to the Supreme Court of Canada replacing the retired justice John C. Major.

In 2011, he was made an Officer of the Order of Canada "for his contributions to education and for his commitment to innovation and research excellence".

In 2012, the Board of Governors of the University of Saskatchewan renamed the College Building the Peter MacKinnon Building.

Notes

References
 

Living people
Lawyers in Saskatchewan
Canadian King's Counsel
Canadian legal scholars
Presidents of the University of Saskatchewan
Canadian university and college faculty deans
Officers of the Order of Canada
People from Prince Edward Island
Canadian people of Scottish descent
University of Saskatchewan alumni
Dalhousie University alumni
Queen's University at Kingston alumni
Presidents of Athabasca University
1947 births
Canadian university and college chief executives
University of Saskatchewan College of Law alumni